Jyoti is a 1981 Indian Hindi-language drama film, produced and directed by Pramod Chakravarty, and written by Sachin Bhaumick. It stars Jeetendra and Hema Malini, with music composed by Bappi Lahiri. The film is based on the Bengali novel Swayamsiddha by Manilal Banerjee.

Plot 

Niranjan Pratap Singh is the stepson of a Zamindar and the real son of Ranimaa Sunanda. He is also the sole heir to the property of the Zamindar, as his elder stepbrother, Govind is drug-induced to the point of senility. When Gauri opposes Niranjan's ruthlessness against fellow-villagers, the Zamindar, angered by her intrusion, complains to her father, Vedji. The Zamindar's anger is subdued when he actually speaks to Gauri and ends up admiring her and asking her hand in marriage for his son, Niranjan. But Sunanda will not hear of her son marrying a poor villager's daughter, and she convinces him that Gauri should marry Govind. Although her father is opposed to his daughter marrying a senile man, Gauri accepts Govind and marries him. She finds out that she and Govind have no status in the household, which is run on the whims and fancies of Sunanda, her maid, Chintamani, and Niranjan. Niranjan is misguided by a dancer, Mallika, and Amirchand, who are after his wealth. Gauri must now decide whether to have her own life, or be chained to a senile half-child half-man.

Cast 
Jeetendra as Govind Pratap Singh
Hema Malini as Gauri
Ashok Kumar as Raja Saab
Shashikala as Sunanda
Om Shivpuri as Vedji
Ajit as Amirchand
Vijayendra Ghatge as Niranjan Pratap Singh
Deven Verma as Siyaram
Birbal as Lallu
Viju Khote
C.S.Dubey
Aruna Irani as Mallika
Sulochana Latkar as Daimaa
Jayshree T. as Champa
Padma Khanna as Chintamani

Soundtrack 
The music was composed by Bappi Lahiri. The song "Chidiya Chon Chon" is based on "Marianne" by Roaring Lion. The song "Thoda Resham Lagta Hai" had fallen into obscurity for over two decades, but gained national attention in 2002 when it was sampled by American producer DJ Quik for the Truth Hurts song "Addictive" which led to a legal dispute that was ultimately resolved. Shortly thereafter, the original song was remixed by Indian composer Harry Anand as "Kaliyon Ka Chaman", sung by Assamese singer Shaswati Phukan.

References

Bibliography

External links 
 

1980s Hindi-language films
1981 drama films
Films based on Indian novels
Films scored by Bappi Lahiri
Indian drama films